is a former Japanese football player, He currently chairman of Iwaki FC.

Playing career
Okura was born in Tokyo on May 22, 1969. After graduating from Waseda University, he joined Hitachi (later Kashiwa Reysol) in 1992. He played as forward from first season. In 1996, he moved to Júbilo Iwata. However he could hardly play in the match. In 1997, he moved to Japan Football League club Brummell Sendai. He played as regular player in 1 season. In 1998, he moved to United States and joined Jacksonville Cyclones. He retired in September 1998.

Club statistics

References

External links

j-league.or.jp

1969 births
Living people
Waseda University alumni
Association football people from Tokyo
Japanese footballers
J1 League players
Japan Football League (1992–1998) players
Kashiwa Reysol players
Júbilo Iwata players
Vegalta Sendai players
Association football forwards